Tam Sventon (Swedish: Ture Sventon) is a fictional private detective based in Stockholm, the main character in nine well-known Swedish children's books written by Åke Holmberg between 1948 and 1973. He is characterized by eating semlas, not being able to pronounce "s" in many situations (for instance, he says "temla" instead of "semla"), and riding on a flying carpet.

Several of the books were translated into English by Lilian Seaton. In the English versions, semlas are replaced by hot cross buns.

Between 1969 and 1975, comics based on the books were also published, drawn by the books' main illustrator Sven Hemmel. A few of these episodes have been collected into albums. 

The books have also been adapted into film, two times as feature films (1972 and 1991), and two times as TV series (1989 and 2019).

The books
Ture Sventon, privatdetektiv (1948), English: Tam Sventon, Private Detective
Ture Sventon i öknen (1949), English: Tam Sventon, Desert Detective
Ture Sventon i London (1950)
Ture Sventon i Paris (1953)
Ture Sventon i Stockholm (1954), English: Tam Sventon and the Silver-Plate Gang
Ture Sventon och Isabella (1955)
Ture Sventon i spökhuset (1965)
Ture Sventon i varuhuset (1968), English: Tam Sventon and Discovery P3X
Ture Sventon i Venedig (1973)

Notes

Ture Sventon at WorldCat
Tam Sventon at WorldCat

Swedish children's book series
Fictional private investigators
Fictional Swedish people
Children's mystery novels
Book series introduced in 1948